Carl Fail (born 16 January 1997) is an English boxer who, as an amateur, was the 2016 ABA welterweight champion and won a silver medal at the 2018 EU Championships.

In July 2020, it was announced that Carl had decided to turn professional along with his twin brother Ben.

References

External links

Living people
1997 births
English male boxers
Sportspeople from Northampton
Welterweight boxers
Middleweight boxers